Trebostovo (Hungarian: Kistorboszló) is a village and municipality in Martin District in the Žilina Region of northern Slovakia.

History
In historical records the village was first mentioned in 1262.

Geography
The municipality lies at an altitude of 470 metres and covers an area of 13.123 km². It has a population of about 455 people.

External links
http://www.statistics.sk/mosmis/eng/run.html

Villages and municipalities in Martin District
Révay family